Glendora may refer to:

Places 
Glendora, California, an American city near Los Angeles
Glendora Curve, an American road interchange between State Route 57 and the Foothill Freeway in California
Glendora High School, in Glendora, Los Angeles County, California, United States
Glendora, Indiana, an American community in Hamilton Township, Sullivan County
Glendora, Michigan, an American community in Weesaw Township, Berrien County
Glendora, Mississippi, an American village in Tallahatchie County
Glendora, New Jersey, an American community in Gloucester Township, Camden County

Other uses 
Glendora (television producer) (born 1928), public-access television producer and host
"Glendora" (song), a 1956 song by Perry Como
Glendora Review, a Nigerian magazine that publishes work relating to art, literature, and culture

See also 
Glenda (given name)